Thomas Bibby (1799–1863) was an Irish poet.

Life
He was born at Kilkenny, studied at Kilkenny College, and then at Trinity College, Dublin, which he entered in 1814 on a scholarship At the age of thirteen, Bibby won a gold medal for science, and he subsequently became one of the best Greek students of his day. He graduated in 1816, and went on to lead a studious but secluded life in his native Kilkenny, developing eccentricities which suggested to many that he was insane.

He died on 7 January 1863, after a painful illness, at his house at St. Canice's Steps. His brother Samuel Hale Bibby, was a surgeon in Green Street, Grosvenor Square, London, and shared his literary taste, but was considered to be more conventional.

Works
Bibby published two dramatic poems in blank verse, Gerald of Kildare (1854), and its sequel, Silken Thomas, or Saint Mary's Abbey (1859).

See also

 Sale of books at Sotheby's 
Obituary and family history dating back to John Bibby, Portreeve of Irishtown in 1691

Notes

Attribution

1799 births
1863 deaths
People educated at Kilkenny College
Alumni of Trinity College Dublin
Irish male poets
19th-century Irish poets
19th-century male writers